Miroslav Pavlović (23 October 1942 – 19 January 2004) was a Serbian footballer. While playing in the United States, he was known as Miro Pavlovic.

On the national level he played for Yugoslavia national team (46 matches/two goals), and was a participant at the 1974 FIFA World Cup and at Euro 1968.

He played domestically for Sloga Užička Požega, Sloboda Titovo Užice and Red Star Belgrade, in Belgium for KFC Diest, and in the United States for the San Jose Earthquakes.

External links
NASL Stats
Serbian national football team website 

1942 births
2004 deaths
People from Požega, Serbia
Serbian footballers
Yugoslav footballers
Yugoslavia international footballers
1974 FIFA World Cup players
UEFA Euro 1968 players
Yugoslav First League players
Belgian Pro League players
North American Soccer League (1968–1984) players
FK Sloga Požega players
FK Sloboda Užice players
Red Star Belgrade footballers
San Jose Earthquakes (1974–1988) players
Serbian expatriate footballers
Yugoslav expatriate footballers
Expatriate footballers in Belgium
Expatriate soccer players in the United States
K.F.C. Diest players
Association football defenders